Justice for Jews from Arab Countries (JJAC) is a political advocacy organization founded in New York in 2002, which was formed by the Conference of Presidents, the World Jewish Congress, the American Sephardi Federation, and the World Organization of Jews from Arab Countries. Today, JJAC works with the American Jewish Committee, American Jewish Congress, Jewish Council for Public Affairs, the World Sephardic Congress.

Mission statement
Its mission statement is:
a) To represent the interests of Jews from Arab countries;
b) To recognize the legacy of Jewish refugees from Arab countries;
c) To register and record personal testimonies of Jews from Arab countries, in order to preserve their history and heritage;
d) To serve as a clearing house of information and documentation on Jewish refugees from Arab countries; and
e) To conduct public education programs that provide historical perspective, in the pursuit of truth, justice and reconciliation.

Achievements
According to founder Stanley Urman in 2009, "Perhaps our most significant accomplishment was the adoption in April 2008 by the United States Congress of Resolution 185, which granted the first-ever recognition of Jewish refugees from the Arab countries. This now requires US diplomats in all Middle East negotiations to refer to a quote of what the resolution calls "multiple population of refugees" with a specific injunction that hands forth any specific reference and "any specific reference to the Palestinian refugees must be matched by an explicit reference to Jewish refugees"... our mandate is to follow that lead. Any explicit reference to Palestinians should be followed by explicit reference to Jewish refugees."

Critics have suggested that JJAC's resolution was "a tactic to help the Israeli government deflect Palestinian refugee claims in any final Israeli-Palestinian peace deal, claims that include Palestinian refugees' demand for the "right of return" to their pre-1948 homes in Israel."

See also
 Jewish refugees
 Jewish exodus from Arab and Muslim countries
 Arab Jews

External links
 Main Website
 'Seeking Justice for Displaced Jews', Stanley Urman, Justice for Jews from Arab Countries, American Sephardi Federation, World Jewish Congress, transcript from Strategic Review Phase II, October 2009
 Fischbach, Michael R., "Palestinian Refugee Compensation and Israeli Counterclaims for Jewish Property in Arab Countries," Journal of Palestine Studies 38, 1 (Autumn 2008): 6-24

Notes

Aliyah
Expulsions of Jews
Immigration to Israel
Jewish exodus from Arab and Muslim countries
2002 establishments in New York (state)
Organizations established in 2002
Jewish organizations based in the United States
Jewish lobbying